The 2008–09 State League was a 50-over women's cricket competition that took place in New Zealand. It ran from December 2008 to January 2009, with 6 provincial teams taking part. Canterbury Magicians beat Wellington Blaze in the final to win the competition, their third State League title in three seasons.

The tournament ran alongside the 2008–09 State League Twenty20.

Competition format 
Teams played in a double round-robin in a group of six, therefore playing 10 matches overall. Matches were played using a one day format with 50 overs per side. The top two in the group advanced to the final.

The group worked on a points system with positions being based on the total points. Points were awarded as follows:

Win: 4 points 
Tie: 2 points 
Loss: 0 points.
Abandoned/No Result: 2 points.
Bonus Point: 1 point awarded for run rate in a match being 1.25x that of opponent.

Points table

Source: ESPN Cricinfo

 Advanced to the Final

Final

Statistics

Most runs

Source: ESPN Cricinfo

Most wickets

Source: ESPN Cricinfo

References

External links
 Series home at ESPN Cricinfo

Hallyburton Johnstone Shield
2008–09 New Zealand cricket season
State League